The Battle of Luchana (Lutxana in Basque) occurred at Bilbao and its vicinities during the night of December 23, 1836 and went on until December 24, 1836.  The Carlists were besieging Bilbao and controlled the water and land routes towards the city.  The battle of Luchana took place in the district belonging to the parish of Deusto and the municipality of Erandio, on the banks of the Asúa River, which empties into the Nervión at the spot known as Luchana.  The Carlists were defeated and the siege of Bilbao was lifted.

References

1836 in Spain
Luchana
Bilbao
December 1836 events
Luchana
Luchana

Basque history